Patrice Wood, born Holly Patrice Wood, is an American journalist, who works as the main news anchor for WJAR, the NBC affiliate in Providence, Rhode Island. She also serves as the education reporter and the Tuesday´s Child segment host. She was inducted into the Rhode Island Heritage Hall of Fame Women Inductees. She was also inducted into the Rhode Island Radio and Television Hall of Fame.

Born in Rockford, Ohio, Wood received a Bachelor of Science in journalism from Bowling Green State University. She started her career reporting and presenting at WDHO-TV in Toledo, Ohio, and did internships with ABC News, United States House of Representatives and Time magazine.

Wood joined WJAR in February 1980, first as a reporter and weekend newsreader, and was promoted to the weeknight 11 o’clock newscasts in 1982. In 1988 she became anchor of the 5:30p.m. edition, the new 5:00 p.m. hour newscast in 1995 and added to her duties the 6:00 report in 1997. She worked most of her tenure with longtime anchor Doug White, along with meteorologist Gary Ley and sportscaster Frank Carpano. She interviewed many personalities, such as Oprah Winfrey and Mark Wahlberg. Wood is the longest-serving female newscaster in Providence television history, with 40 years on air. According to her, 60% of the children featured on her long-running segment Tuesday´s Child have found a new home.

In 2017, she was the commencement speaker at Roger Williams University.

Personal life 
Wood has two children, Stephanie and Jonathan, and is married to Paul Pabis, who works at WBZ-TV as the director of operations and engineering.

References

American television journalists
American television journalists
People from Rockford, Ohio
Living people
Year of birth missing (living people)
21st-century American women